Anarchist League may refer to:
Revolutionary Anarchist Bowling League, a militant American anti-war collective established in 1987
A fictional organization in the novelette "The Last of the Masters" (1954), by Philip K. Dick